The 1917 SMU Mustangs football team was an American football team that represented Southern Methodist University (SMU) as a member of the Texas Intercollegiate Athletic Association (TIAA) during the 1917 college football season. In its first season under head coach J. Burton Rix, the team compiled an overall record of 3–2–3 and outscored opponents by a total of 74 to 49. The team played its home games at Armstrong Field in University Park, Texas.

Schedule

References

SMU
SMU Mustangs football seasons
SMU Mustangs football